Toowoomba West was an electoral district of the Legislative Assembly in the Australian state of Queensland. It was created with the 1960 redistribution and removed by the 1972 redistribution.

The seat was based in the City of Toowoomba.

The member for North Toowoomba, Jack Duggan successfully stood for election in Toowoomba West in 1960 after his previous seat was lost in the redistribution.

The sitting member, Ray Bousen, successfully stood for election in the new seat of Toowoomba North in the 1972 election.

Members for Toowoomba West

Election results

See also
 Historical Seats of Toowoomba
 Electoral districts of Queensland
 Members of the Queensland Legislative Assembly by year
 :Category:Members of the Queensland Legislative Assembly by name

References

Darling Downs
Toowoomba
Toowoomba West